In enzymology, a valine-3-methyl-2-oxovalerate transaminase is an enzyme that catalyzes the chemical reaction

L-valine + (S)-3-methyl-2-oxopentanoate  3-methyl-2-oxobutanoate + L-isoleucine

Thus, the two substrates of this enzyme are L-valine and (S)-3-methyl-2-oxopentanoate, whereas its two products are 3-methyl-2-oxobutanoate and L-isoleucine.

This enzyme belongs to the family of transferases, specifically the transaminases, which transfer nitrogenous groups.  The systematic name of this enzyme class is L-valine:(S)-3-methyl-2-oxopentanoate aminotransferase. Other names in common use include valine-isoleucine transaminase, valine-3-methyl-2-oxovalerate aminotransferase, alanine-valine transaminase, valine-2-keto-methylvalerate aminotransferase, and valine-isoleucine aminotransferase.

References

 

EC 2.6.1
Enzymes of unknown structure